The C38 class (occasionally known as the 38 class and nicknamed "Pacifics" by some railwaymen) was a class of steam locomotive built for the New South Wales Government Railways in Australia.

Constructed between January 1943 and November 1949, the 30 locomotives in the class were designed to haul express passenger services throughout New South Wales. They were the only New South Wales locomotives to use the popular Pacific 4-6-2 wheel arrangement and were the last steam locomotives in the state to be built for passenger train operation, all subsequent deliveries being specifically for freight haulage.

Design

The 38 class were first conceived in the 1930s when the NSWGR established there was a need for a locomotive to eliminate the complications of double heading on a number of fast intrastate passenger trains.

The design was influenced by the fashion for streamlining at the time, including elements of the class J locomotives of the Norfolk and Western Railway and of some of the streamlined versions of the PRR K4 locomotives in the United States. The design team was headed by Harold Young, the Principal Design Engineer (later Chief Mechanical Engineer) of the NSWGR. The conditions of trackwork with frequent sharp curvature to be traversed at high speed would require six-coupled driving wheels in a 'Pacific' 4-6-2 configuration. Maintenance requirements suggested a two-cylinder simple steam locomotive.

The design was carried out by the NSWGR Locomotive Section of the Design Office and incorporated the latest developments in locomotive design from Australia and overseas. The incorporation of as many Australian manufactured components as possible was a requirement at the design stage.

Similarly to the earlier D57 class (which had some input from Young), the massively proportioned locomotive incorporated a cast steel chassis. The design also sported cast Boxpok coupled wheels for better rotational balance, and a Delta trailing truck.

History

In May 1939, an order for five 38 class locomotives was placed with Clyde Engineering. They suffered many delays during construction, mostly due to resource shortages caused by World War II and the Great Depression. The first five locomotives, built by Clyde Engineering, had a semi-streamlined boiler casing. However with this design, the firemen could not maintain steam in the 245 psi boiler – the highest boiler pressure of any engine in Australia. In early trials on the Southern line, 3801, the class leader, was allocated two firemen. The fault was located when it was found that the shape of the blast pipe prevented steam from the cylinders from passing optimally into the petticoat pipe below the chimney, through which it was ejected to the atmosphere. In turn, this reduced the suction of hot gases through the boiler tubes, making it more demanding to fire. Soon the blast pipe was adjusted, and the C38 class became noted for the clean "bark" of its exhaust.

As the last of the five initial locomotives were leaving the shop in 1945, a decision was made to purchase more. This order of 25 locomotives were built at the New South Wales Government Railways' Eveleigh Railway Workshops (13, even-numbered) and Cardiff Locomotive Workshops (12, odd-numbered); all were non-streamlined for quicker maintenance.

The locomotives built by Clyde Engineering were delivered in wartime grey. After the war, all were repainted green, as the 25 unstreamlined locomotives had been from new. In the 1950s, all except 3813 were painted black. 3801 and 3830 had their green livery restored due to pressure from heritage groups in the 1960s.

Among the services they initially hauled were the Central West Express, Newcastle Flyer, Melbourne Limited Express, Riverina Express and South Coast Daylight Express as well as the overnight mail trains. Because of their axle load, they were confined to operating between Sydney and the following extremities of operation: Port Kembla (Coniston), Albury, Dubbo and Maitland, although they worked the North Coast passenger trains to Brisbane until track problems surfaced.

Following the arrival of the 42, 43 and 44 class diesel locomotives in the 1950s, these began to take over some express services, but the 38 class continued to haul many passenger and freight trains. Even after the electrification of the Main Western line to Lithgow in 1957 and the Main North line to Gosford in January 1960, using 46 class electric locomotives, the 38s still operated the Central West Express between Lithgow and Orange into the 1960s and the Newcastle Flyer between Gosford and Newcastle until December 1970.

The 38 class briefly returned to the former Melbourne Limited Express route in April 1962, when 3830 and 3813 hauled the inaugural standard gauge Spirit of Progress from Albury to Sydney. The first 38 class locomotive was withdrawn in 1961 with the last withdrawn in December 1970.

In August 1970, 3801 hauled the Western Endeavour to Perth following the conversion to standard gauge of the Sydney–Perth rail corridor with 3813 assisting as far as Port Pirie. In April 1988, 3801 again operated to Perth during the Australian Bicentenary.

Locomotive 3801 featured in an evocative 1974 short film, A Steam Train Passes, which won many awards and is generally regarded as Australia's finest railway film.

Roster

Preservation
4 of the 38 class locomotives survive-3801, 3813, 3820 and 3830. 3813 is in pieces at Dorrigo after an overhaul in 1972 by the former NSW Rail Transport Museum was forced to be stopped by the then commissioner of the Public Transport Commission, Philip Shirley who ordered that the locomotive's parts be transferred to the scrapyard. The NSWRTM managed a reprive and the parts were sent to be stored in many locations. Components such as the wheels, cab and smokebox were stored in S trucks at Thirlmere, the frame and tender at Clyde and the boiler at Castle Hill   until they were donated to the Dorrigo Steam Railway & Museum. Over time all were donated to the Dorrigo museum and put in storage there

References

External links

Clyde Engineering locomotives
Railway locomotives introduced in 1943
38
4-6-2 locomotives
Standard gauge locomotives of Australia